Hasan Salih Kabze (born 26 May 1982) is a Turkish former professional footballer who played as a striker. Formerly, he played for Bucaspor, Çanakkale Dardanelspor, Galatasaray SK, Rubin Kazan, Montpellier HSC, Orduspor, Konyaspor, Akhisar Belediyespor, and Sivasspor. In 2006, he made seven appearances for the international scoring twice.

He studied at Anadolu University.

Club career

Galatasaray
Kabze joined Galatasaray SK during the 2004–05 winter transfer window, and scored a goal in his debut on 4 February 2005, when the team beat Gaziantepspor 5–1 in a Süper Lig match. He scored a further two goals against Beşiktaş on the 33rd week of the Süper Lig, delivering a 2–1 win against the local rivals with the last kick of the match. After this game, Galatasaray won that year's League title.

Rubin Kazan
On 9 August 2007, Kabze joined the Russian Premier League team Rubin Kazan for a fee of €1.5 million. He scored his first goal for Rubin Kazan in a 3–1 victory against Spartak Moscow.

Montpellier
Kabze joined Ligue club Montpellier HSC in July 2010.

Orduspor
Kabze joined Orduspor on 17 January 2012. He was named as the team captain for the 2012–13 season.

Konyaspor
Kabze joined Konyaspor on 14 August 2013.

International career
Kabze made his Turkey national team debut against Azerbaijan on 12 April 2006. Kabze also played three times for the Turkey national football B team in Future Cup'05 matches against Scotland, Germany and Czech Republic, scoring one goal each against Scotland and the Czech Republic. He played four times for Turkey U18. He scored two goals under-21

Career statistics

Club

International goals

Honours
Bucaspor
 Under-17 Turkish League: 1999–2000

Galatasaray
 Super League: 2005–06
 Turkish Cup: 2005

Rubin Kazan
 Russian Premier League: 2008–09, 2009–10
 Russian Super Cup: 2010

References

External links
 
 
 
 

1982 births
Turkish people of Circassian descent
Footballers from Ankara
Living people
Turkish footballers
Turkey international footballers
Turkey B international footballers
Turkey under-21 international footballers
Association football forwards
Bucaspor footballers
Dardanelspor footballers
Galatasaray S.K. footballers
FC Rubin Kazan players
Montpellier HSC players
Orduspor footballers
Konyaspor footballers
Akhisarspor footballers
Sivasspor footballers
Altınordu F.K. players
Süper Lig players
Russian Premier League players
Ligue 1 players
TFF First League players
Anadolu University alumni
Turkish expatriate footballers
Expatriate footballers in Russia
Turkish expatriate sportspeople in Russia
Expatriate footballers in France
Turkish expatriate sportspeople in France